The 2016 Castle Point Borough Council election took place on 5 May 2016 to elect members of Castle Point Borough Council in England. This was on the same day as other local elections.

Results Summary

Ward results

Appleton

Boyce

Canvey Island Central

Canvey Island East

Canvey Island North

Canvey Island South

Canvey Island Winter Gardens

Cedar Hall

St. George's

By-election
A by-election to the ward was held the same day following the death of Jacqui Govier.

St. James

St. Mary's

St. Peter's

Victoria

References

2016 English local elections
2016
2010s in Essex